Norman Jeschke (born 2 March 1979 in East Berlin, East Germany) is a German pair skater.

Career 
Jeschke began skating at the age of three and was permitted to join the specially promoted sports club SC Dynamo Berlin. He first skated as a single skater, but later switched to pair skating. With partner Christine Tiltmann, he is the 1997 German junior national champion. After that partnership, he teamed up with Mariana Kautz. They placed 14th at the 2002 Winter Olympics. Their partnership ended following the 2002 World Championships.

In May 2002, Jeschke teamed up with Danish figure skater Mikkeline Kierkgaard. They won the bronze medal at the 2004 German Championships. They were unable to compete internationally that season due to International Skating Union rules regarding country changes. They missed the 2004–2005 season because of injuries. After several injuries to Mikkeline Kierkgaard, they ended their partnership.

Norman Jeschke worked for the Bundeswehr until November 2005. In February 2006, he began training with Annette Dytrt to create a pairs partnership but they never competed together.

In 2006, Jeschke joined the Pro7-Skating-Show "Stars auf Eis" (Stars on Ice), a German version of Dancing on Ice, partnered with Magdalena Brzeska. His competitive figure skating career came to an end.

Jeschke made a few appearances in the German soap opera Alles was zählt as himself and paired with Tanja Szewczenko's character Diana.

Personal life 
Szewczenko and Jeschke's daughter, Jona Valentina, was born on Friday 25 February 2011.

Results

With Kautz

With Kierkgaard

Programs 
(with Kierkgaard)

(with Kautz)

References

External links
 
 

1979 births
Living people
German male pair skaters
Olympic figure skaters of Germany
Figure skaters at the 2002 Winter Olympics
Figure skaters from Berlin
20th-century German people
21st-century German people